The ZEN V and the ZEN V Plus are portable media players manufactured by Creative Technology. The user interface on this player, the same as the one on Creative's ZEN Vision:M, was patented by Creative on January 9, 2005. Creative sued Apple over the use of this user interface; Apple later settled for $100 million.

They are very small sized and feature an OLED screen measuring 1.5 inches. It is controlled using a 5-way mini joystick. The ZEN V Plus has accumulated many awards, including CNET Editor's Choice for June 2006. The players are nearly identical save for video playback and FM radio, which the ZEN V Plus supports but the regular ZEN V does not.

In August 2007, Creative introduced a 16 GB version of the ZEN V Plus, making it the first flash-based player with that capacity.

Specifications

Both players
Dimensions: 2.7" x  x 15.9 mm)
Weight: 
Display:  OLED display
Resolution: 128x128 pixels
Battery Type: Built-in Lithium Ion
Music Formats Supported: MP3, WMA, WAV, Audible, and Podcasts (via ZENCast Organizer)
PlaysForSure (Windows Media Audio 9 DRM) Compatible: Subscription and Download
Photo Formats Supported: JPEG
Custom Wallpapers: JPEG
USB: High-Speed 2.0, 1.1
Organizer: Calendar, Contact, Task list
Signal-to-Noise Ratio: Up to 92 dB
Harmonic Distortion Output: <0.05%
Frequency Response: 20 Hz - 20 kHz
Voice Recording: Yes
Line In recording: Yes
Power Charging: Charges via power adapter or PC through USB
Album art: Supported
System Requirements: Windows Vista and Windows XP out of box. Works with Windows 2000 through Windows 98SE after a Legacy OS Driver update available here. Linux compatibility is possible, but unsupported.
Compatible with Windows Media Player
Bundled Software: MediaSource, Media Explorer
Unsupported Third-Party Software:
Macintosh:XNJB available here.
 Linux:
 Amarok, compiled with libMTP support, available here.
 KZenExplorer, available here.
 Gnomad, available here.

ZEN V
 1, 2, 4 and 8GB
Colors
1GB: Black/Orange, White/Orange, White/Red (Target Exclusive)
2GB: White/Green, Black/Green
4GB: Black/Blue
8GB: Black/Blue, Black/Orange,

ZEN V Plus
1, 2, 4, 8 and 16GB
Video formats supported: Uncompressed AVI: Native; Most other major formats through conversion.
FM Tuner: Yes
Colors
1GB: Black/Orange, White/Orange, White/Red (Target Exclusive)
2GB: Black/Green, White/Green, Pink/White
4GB: Black/Blue
8GB: Black/Blue, Black/Red Black/orange
16GB Black/White

See also
Creative ZEN
Creative Technology
Comparison of portable media players

References

Portable media players
Creative Technology products
Audiovisual introductions in 2006